George Hedley was an English professional footballer who played as a centre half.

Career
Hedley signed for Bradford City in March 1910 after playing local football, leaving the club later that year. During his time with Bradford City he made two appearances in the Football League.

Sources

References

Date of death missing
English footballers
Bradford City A.F.C. players
English Football League players
Association football defenders
Year of birth missing
Year of death missing